Iolaus alcibiades, the giant sapphire, is a butterfly in the family Lycaenidae. It is found in Guinea, Sierra Leone, Ivory Coast, Ghana, Togo, Nigeria (south and the Cross River loop), Cameroon, Bioko, Gabon, the Republic of the Congo and the Democratic Republic of the Congo (Équateur and Lulua). The habitat consists of forests and more open habitats.

The larvae feed on the flowers of Loranthus incanus. They are associated with the ant species Crematogaster buchneri.

References

External links

Die Gross-Schmetterlinge der Erde 13: Die Afrikanischen Tagfalter. Plate XIII 67 f

Butterflies described in 1871
Iolaus (butterfly)
Butterflies of Africa
Taxa named by William Forsell Kirby